Narine Grigoryan (Armenian: Նարինե Գրիգորյան born 14 June 1980) is an Armenian actress known for her role in Yeva, the Armenian entry for the Best Foreign Language Film at the 90th Academy Awards. In this film she portrays, a young woman flees to Karabakh with her daughter to escape her in-laws after her husband's death. She also known for her roles in Half Moon Bay (2014), Bravo Virtuoso (2016), The Line 2: 25 Years Later (2017) and Long Return (2017).

References

External links
 

1980 births
Armenian film actresses
Living people
People from Stepanakert
21st-century Armenian actresses